The Dickinson County Courthouse and Jail is an historic complex of governmental buildings located at 700 South Stephenson Avenue in Iron Mountain, Michigan. On May 15, 1980, the complex was added to the National Register of Historic Places.

History
Dickinson County was the last of Michigan's counties to be organized.  This courthouse and the associated jail were built in 1896 from plans by architect James E. Clancy of Antigo, Wisconsin, a former Iron Mountain resident.  It was built by E.E. Grip & Co.  The building was renovated in 1935, adding sleeping rooms for jurors, and a two-story wing connecting the courthouse to the nearby jail. The clock in the courthouse tower was made by the Seth Thomas Clock Company in 1935; it was the last weight and pulley tower clock in the state.  It was converted to electrical operation in the mid-1950s.

A new jail was constructed in 1975, and the old structure remained vacant and in disrepair until 1979. After a renovation, county offices moved in during 1982.  A small single-story addition was constructed more recently.

Description
The Dickinson County Courthouse is a 2-1/2 story Richardsonian Romanesque structure, built of red brick and Portage Entry sandstone.   It has a slate hip roof and a square brick clock tower. The front facade contains a rounded arch entryway, supported by two granite columns. Dentiled stone decorates the cornice line. The interior has been extensively remodeled.

The medieval-inspired jail was designed to complement the courthouse.  The jail is a rectangular, two-story structure built of red brick and sandstone, capped with stone battlemented parapets and a tin roof. It originally contained 36 cells, along with the sheriff's quarters.

References

Courthouses on the National Register of Historic Places in Michigan
Michigan State Historic Sites
Government buildings completed in 1896
Buildings and structures in Dickinson County, Michigan
County courthouses in Michigan
County government buildings in Michigan
Clock towers in Michigan
National Register of Historic Places in Dickinson County, Michigan
1896 establishments in Michigan